Remigio Sabbadini (23 November 1850 – 7 February 1934) was an Italian classical philologist.

Biography 
Born in Sarego, Province of Vicenza to Giuseppe and Luigia Allegro, a peasant couple, Sabbadini began studying in Veneto before moving to Florence, where he graduated in Latin literature with a thesis on Virgil . Qualified as a lecturer in high schools, in 1886 he became a professor of Latin literature at the University of Catania , and then at the Accademia scientifico-letteraria di Milano from 1900 (which with the Gentile Reform , became part of the University of Milan). He was retired due to his age in 1926, when he was appointed professor emeritus.

He was a corresponding member of the Istituto Lombardo Accademia di Scienze e Lettere since 1905, corresponding member of the Accademia delle Scienze di Torino from 1911, correspondent member of the Accademia dei Lincei since 1910 and national member since 1920; and a member of the Accademia dell'Arcadia with the "pastoral name" of Filarco Eteo. He was elected a corresponding fellow of the British Academy in 1922.

Married in 1890 to Amalia Grifi, he had a daughter, Ada, wife of the politician and Latinist Concetto Marchesi.

References 

1850 births
1934 deaths
Italian classical philologists
Corresponding Fellows of the British Academy